Jamyang Namgyal (died 1616) was a 17th-century Namgyal dynasty king (gyalpo) of Ladakh, India from 1595 till his death in 1616 AD. He was succeeded by his son Sengge Namgyal in the year 1616 AD.

Biography
Jamyang Namgyal was born to and was the eldest son of Tsewang Namgyal who was the king of Ladakh from 1575 to 1595 AD. Jamyang Namgyal took the reign of the Namgyal dynasty of Ladakh in 1595 AD and continued to be in power until his death in 1616 AD. Jamyang Namgyal was married to Gyal Khatun, the daughter of Ali Sher Khan Anchan who attacked Ladakh and imprisoned Namgyal.

Battle with Ali Sher Khan Anchan
Jamyang Namgyal during his reign decided to support the Sultan of Chigtan and to capture Skardu. Namgyal's army was crossing the mountain passes towards Purig during the winter season where his troops disappeared due to violent storm. Ali Sher Khan Anchan's well trained army attacked Namgyal's army on the way and held them there until all the passes and valleys were blocked with snow; compelling Namgyal to surrender. Namgyal was imprisoned by Ali Sher Khan in Skardu. Sher Khann then attacked Ladakh, took control of the place, destroyed historical monuments and records. After returning to Skardu, Sher Khan asked Jamyang Namgyal to marry his daughter Gyal Khatun in exchange of his release. Namgyal married Ali's daughter and returned to Ladakh.

See also
Namgyal dynasty of Ladakh

References

1616 deaths
Kings of Ladakh
Year of birth uncertain
Year of birth unknown